USS Tuna has been the name of more than one United States Navy ship, and may refer to:

 USS Tuna (SS-27), a submarine renamed  before she was launched, in commission from 1913 to 1919
 , a patrol vessel in commission from 1917 to 1919
 , a submarine in commission from 1941 to 1946

United States Navy ship names